Avinoam Lerner (born 13 October 1947) is an Israeli-American film producer, primarily of American action movies. Lerner is the founder and CEO of Millennium Films.

Life and career
Avi Lerner was born in Haifa, Israel, on October 13, 1947, to a Jewish family; he grew up on Hatzionut Boulevard. He joined the Israeli military in 1966 and served in the Six-Day War and in the Paratroopers Brigade. In an interview with Pnai Plus, Lerner said he took part in the battle for the town of Rafah before penetrating as far as the Suez Canal. He served in the 1973 Yom Kippur War as a reservist.

Lerner originally worked in movie theaters in Tel Aviv but later relocated to South Africa, where he produced several films and also owned a chain of movie theaters until relocating once again to Los Angeles in the early 1990s. In 1991, he served as President of the independent production/distribution company, Global Pictures.

Lerner founded two production companies, Nu Image and Millennium Films, with Trevor Short, Danny Dimbort and Danny Lerner. The companies have a varied output, though the vast majority are action films. Most of the action films Avi produces are filmed in Bulgaria, where he owns Nu Boyana Film.

Nu Image, now Millennium Films, bought the independent film studio First Look Studios in 2007 and restructured the organization to distribute their specialty films. In 2007, Lerner obtained the rights to the Rambo franchise and rebooted the series in 2008 with Rambo. 

Until his success with The Expendables (2010), Lerner's reputation was of a B movie producer. Lerner has complained that Israel is the only country where his work is criticized, and he avoids giving interviews to Israeli reporters.

Lerner describes his approach to the film industry as purely business-oriented: unlike Hollywood's larger film studios, which invest much larger sums of money to cover production expenses but also lose money from time to time, Lerner's team carefully calculates the potential revenue of a given film and tailors the production costs accordingly.

Sexual harassment allegations 
In 2017, Lerner was sued by a former employee for sexual harassment and gender discrimination. Lerner claimed the accusations were "all lies". In 2018, Hollywood actor Terry Crews accused Lerner of making a phone call to his manager in which he said Lerner threatened to introduce difficulties into Terry Crews' career unless Crews dropped his case against Hollywood talent agency William Morris Endeavor, employer of agent and founding member Adam Venit.

Action stars 
The bulk of Lerner's films featured action stars who were at their peak in the 1980s–1990s: Jean-Claude Van Damme, Steven Seagal, Wesley Snipes and Dolph Lundgren, usually released as direct-to-video. Lerner produced Rambo starring Sylvester Stallone, and Righteous Kill starring Robert De Niro and Al Pacino for Millennium Films and Emmett/Furla Films. He produced The Expendables, directed by Stallone.

Other features Lerner has had a hand in include: End Game, starring Cuba Gooding Jr. and James Woods; Edison, starring Morgan Freeman, Kevin Spacey, and Justin Timberlake, 16 Blocks, The Black Dahlia, The Wicker Man, and even Werner Herzog's Bad Lieutenant: Port of Call New Orleans, starring Nicolas Cage. He is also listed as a producer in the thriller Trespass.

Filmography

References

External links 
 
 Nu Image / Millennium Films 

1947 births
American film producers
Israeli film producers
Israeli Jews
People from Haifa
Living people
Israeli emigrants to the United States